Ashling Thompson  is an Irish sportswoman. She plays camogie with her local club, Milford, and with the Cork county team. Her partner is well known Limerick All Ireland Winning Midfielder Darragh O'Donovan

Career

Thompson began playing camogie for Milford aged 6. With them, she was won three All-Ireland Senior Club Camogie Championships.

Ashling has won the All-Ireland camogie championship four times. She helped her team to glory in: 2014, 2015, 2017 and 2018

Thompson won an All Star Award in 2015 and 2017.

She was the subject of a Laochra Gael episode in 2018.

Personal life
Thompson's mother was involved in the founding of Milford camogie club.

A car accident in 2009 caused severe muscle damage to her neck and back and led to a period of mental illness. In 2012, a boyfriend committed suicide. Thompson supports the Irish Life Health Schools' Fitness Challenge and has spoken out on mental health issues.

Thompson appeared on The Late Late Show on 10 February 2017.

She is known for her large collection of tattoos, and work with various charities.

Legal issues

Thompson was alleged to have assaulted two women in a Cork City pub on 25 February 2018, in violation of Section 2 of the Non-Fatal Offences Against the Person Act 1997. A section 2 charge carries a maximum sentence of six months' imprisonment. On 1 May 2019, Thompson pled guilty to assaulting Jennifer Coakley.
On 25 June 2019, Thompson pleaded guilty to the two assaults from 25 February 2018 and was ordered by the court to pay €6,000 to cover charitable donations and the expenses of the victims or face jail if they are not paid.

See also
2018 All-Ireland Senior Camogie Championship

References

External links 

Living people
Cork camogie players
Sportspeople from County Cork
1990 births